Adma wa Dafneh or Adma ( or ) is a town in the Keserwan District of the Keserwan-Jbeil Governorate in Lebanon. The town consists of the villages of Adma and Dafneh. The town is located 27 kilometers north of Beirut on a cliff facing South.

Its elevation ranges between 100 and 330 meters above sea level and the town's total land area consists of 456 hectares. Adma wa Dafneh is markedly more vacant and vast than most Lebanese settlements, and is strongly connected to Jounieh and Tabarja to its south and north respectively. Adma wa Dafneh's inhabitants are predominantly Maronite Christians.

Etymology
"Adam" (אדם in Hebrew) literally means red, and there is an etymological connection between adam and admah, admah designating "red clay" or "red ground" in a non-theological context. The Village of Adma was named after its fertile and rich soil which was covered by vegetation before urbanisation.

Topography and History

Topography
Adma wa Dafneh is largely made up of sparse structures situated between thick brush and forestation on the limestone hillsides and cliffs of Kasrouane.

History
In February 1990, following the Taif agreement ending the 15 year civil war, the town was the site of a major battle between the Lebanese Army and Lebanese Forces (LF). Two hundred commandos loyal to General Michel Aoun were
trapped in their base in Adma wa Dafna by Samir Geagea’s LF fighters until a truce was arranged, 17 February, to allow their evacuation. Traces of the fighting can still be seen. The town also features a ruined Civil War-era structure with a hidden arms depository, now empty, that survived the war.

Residency and Accommodations

Residency
Adma wa Dafneh today is mostly home to the mid-class and the high society, as well as foreign diplomats and international business men working in Lebanon. The town includes some of the most prestigious gated communities in Lebanon such as BelHorizon Village and Admir. Mansions, large homes, as well as family buildings represent most of the dwellings in Adma.

Accommodations
The town has also managed to create its own ecosystem of accommodations which includes a Carrefour Market, convenience stores, gas stations, churches, a medical center, schools, restaurants, shops, hotels, etc.

References

External links
Adma Oua Dafneh, localiban

Populated places in Keserwan District
Maronite Christian communities in Lebanon